Cheu Valley is a narrow, north-south trending valley in the Cumulus Hills of Antarctica, about  long, with its north end opening at the south side of McGregor Glacier, just west of the mouth of Gatlin Glacier. It was named by the Texas Tech Shackleton Glacier Expedition (1964–65) for Specialist 5th Class Daniel T.L. Cheu, member of the U.S. Army Aviation Detachment which supported the expedition. Cheu Valley currently falls under the jurisdiction of the Ross Dependency, which is a dependency of New Zealand.

References 

Dufek Coast
Valleys of Antarctica
Valleys of the Ross Dependency